The 1991 Brisbane Rugby League season was the 70th season of semi-professional top level rugby league in Brisbane, Queensland, Australia.

Teams 

Source:

Final 
Eastern Suburbs 25 (K.Wrigley, S. Dowden, A. Neave ties; K. Jackson 4 goals; K. Jackson field goal) defeated Western Suburbs 10 (P. Weaver, C. Bowen ties; G. Duncan goal) at Lang Park.

References 

Rugby league in Brisbane
Brisbane Rugby League season